Bojangles may refer to:

People nicknamed "Bojangles"
 Bill Robinson (1877–1949), American dancer and actor
 Ron Atkinson (born 1939), former British football player and manager

Media
 Bojangles (film), a 2001 TV-movie about Robinson and starring Gregory Hines
 "Mr. Bojangles" (song), by American country music artist Jerry Jeff Walker
 "Bojangles" (song), by rapper Pitbull
 "Bojangles of Harlem", a 1936 song from the Fred Astaire movie Swing Time
 Bonejangles, a character in the 2005 animated film Corpse Bride

Other uses
 Bojangles (restaurant), a fast-food restaurant chain
 Bojangles Coliseum, an arena in Charlotte, North Carolina

See also
 Mr. Bojangles (disambiguation)